John W. Burton (August 18, 1906 – June 1, 1978) was an American cinematographer and animated film producer best known for his work at Warner Bros. Cartoons.

Biography 
Burton was born on August 18, 1906, in Rockford, Illinois. He was employed in Los Angeles at Leon Schlesinger Productions, which made the Looney Tunes and Merrie Melodies series of cartoons for Warner Bros., as a cameraman, technician and general troubleshooter. In 1944, after Warner Bros. bought out Schlesinger and the studio was renamed Warner Bros. Cartoons, Burton was promoted to production manager. In 1958, after Edward Selzer retired, he was promoted to producer. He was also able to accept the Oscar for Best Animated Short Subject in 1958 for the Bugs Bunny cartoon Knighty Knight Bugs. Burton left Warner Bros. in 1961 to become an executive at Pacific Title & Art Studio which Schlesinger founded. He was replaced by David H. DePatie.

Burton died June 1, 1978, at age 71 in Los Angeles.

References

External links
 

1906 births
1978 deaths
People from Rockford, Illinois
American cinematographers
American animated film producers
Film producers from Illinois
20th-century American businesspeople
Warner Bros. Cartoons people
Producers who won the Best Animated Short Academy Award